is a fictional species in the Pokémon media franchise. Designed by Atsuko Nishida and Ken Sugimori, Pikachu first appeared in the 1996 Japanese video games Pokémon Red and Green created by Game Freak and Nintendo, which were released outside of Japan in 1998 as Pokémon Red and Blue. Pikachu is a yellow, mouse-like creature with electrical abilities. It is a major character in the Pokémon franchise, serving as its mascot and as a major mascot for Nintendo.

Pikachu is widely considered to be the most popular and well-known Pokémon species, largely due to its appearance in the Pokémon anime television series as the companion of protagonist Ash Ketchum. In most vocalized appearances Pikachu is voiced by Ikue Ōtani, though it has been portrayed by other actors, notably Ryan Reynolds in the live-action animated film Pokémon Detective Pikachu. Pikachu has been well received by critics, with particular praise given for its cuteness, and has come to be regarded as an icon of Japanese pop culture.

Concept and design

Developed by Game Freak and published by Nintendo, the Pokémon series began in Japan in 1996, and features several species of creatures called "Pokémon" that players, called "trainers", are encouraged to capture, train, and use to battle other players' Pokémon or interact with the game's world. Pikachu was one of several different Pokémon designs conceived by Game Freak's character development team. Artist Atsuko Nishida is credited as the main person behind Pikachu's design, which was later finalized by artist Ken Sugimori. According to series producer Satoshi Tajiri, the name is derived from a combination of two Japanese onomatopoeia: ピカピカ (pikapika), a sparkling sound, and チューチュー (chūchū), a sound a mouse makes. Despite its name's origins, however, Nishida based Pikachu's original design, especially its cheeks, on squirrels. Developer Junichi Masuda noted Pikachu's name as one of the most difficult to create, due to an effort to make it appealing to both Japanese and American audiences.

Pikachu was designed around the concept of electricity. They are creatures that have short, yellow fur with brown markings covering their backs and parts of their lightning bolt-shaped tails. They have black-tipped, pointed ears and red circular pouches on their cheeks, which can spark with electricity. They attack primarily by projecting electricity from their bodies at their targets. Within the context of the franchise, Pikachu can transform, or "evolve," into a Raichu when exposed to a "Thunder Stone." Pikachu was originally planned to have a second evolution called Gorochu, which was intended to be the evolved form of Raichu. In Pokémon Gold and Silver, "Pichu" was introduced as an evolutionary predecessor to Pikachu. In Pokémon Diamond and Pearl, gender differences were introduced; since those games, female Pikachu have an indent at the end of their tails, giving the tail a heart-shaped appearance.

Initially, both Pikachu and fellow Pokémon Clefairy were chosen to be lead characters for the franchise merchandising, with the latter as the primary mascot to make the early comic book series more "engaging". Production company OLM, Inc. suggested Pikachu as the mascot of the animated series after finding that Pikachu was popular amongst schoolchildren and could appeal to both boys and girls, as well as their mothers. Pikachu resembled a familiar, intimate pet, and yellow is a primary color and easier for children to recognize from a distance. Additionally, the only other competing yellow mascot at the time was Winnie-the-Pooh. 

Pikachu's design has evolved from its once-pudgy body to having a slimmer waist, straighter spine, and more defined face and neck; Sugimori has stated these design changes originated in the anime, making Pikachu easier to animate, and were adopted to the games for consistency. "Fat Pikachu" 
was revisited in Pokémon Sword and Shield, where Pikachu received a Gigantamax Form resembling its original design.

Appearances

In the video games
Pikachu has appeared in all Pokémon video games, except Black and White, without having to trade. The game Pokémon Yellow features a Pikachu as the only available Starter Pokémon. Based on the Pikachu from the Pokémon anime, it refuses to stay in its Poké Ball, and instead follows the main character around on screen. The trainer can speak to it and it displays different reactions depending on how it is treated. 

An event from April 1 to May 5, 2010, allowed players of Pokémon HeartGold and SoulSilver to access a route on the Pokéwalker, which solely contained Pikachu which knew attacks that they were not normally compatible with, Surf and Fly. Both of these attacks can be used outside battles as travel aids. Seven "Cap" forms of Pikachu, wearing caps belonging to Ash Ketchum across different seasons, were released across Pokémon Sun and Moon as well as their Ultra versions. These games also released two Z-Crystals exclusive to Pikachu: Pikanium Z, which upgrades Volt Tackle into Catastropika, and Pikashunium Z, which upgrades Thunderbolt into 10,000,000 Volt Thunderbolt when held by a Cap form of Pikachu.

Pokémon Let's Go, which is based heavily on Yellow, has Pikachu as a starter in one of its two versions, with the latter version using Eevee instead. This starter Pikachu has access to several secret techniques and exclusive moves. In Pokémon Sword and Shield, Pikachu gained access to a special Gigantamax form.

Aside from the main series, Pikachu stars in Hey You, Pikachu! for the Nintendo 64; the player interacts with Pikachu through a microphone, issuing commands to play various mini-games and act out situations. The game Pokémon Channel follows a similar premise of interacting with the Pikachu, though without the microphone. Pikachu appear in almost all levels of Pokémon Snap and its sequel, New Pokémon Snap, games where the player takes pictures of Pokémon for a score. A Pikachu is one of the sixteen starters and ten partners in the Pokémon Mystery Dungeon series. PokéPark Wii: Pikachu's Adventure and its sequel, PokéPark 2: Wonders Beyond, features a Pikachu as the main protagonist. Pikachu has appeared in all five Super Smash Bros. fighting games as a playable character, including in Pokkén Tournament, along with "Pikachu Libre", based on "Cosplay Pikachu" from Omega Ruby and Alpha Sapphire. Detective Pikachu features a talking Pikachu who becomes a detective and helps to solve mysteries. Pikachu has also appeared in Pokémon Unite, Pokémon Rumble World, Pokémon Go, and also puzzle games such as Pokémon Shuffle, Pokémon Battle Trozei, Pokémon Picross, and Pokémon Café Mix.

In the anime

The Pokémon anime series and films feature the adventures of Ash Ketchum and his Pikachu. Ash journeys to train and capture Pokémon while the members of the villainous organization Team Rocket attempt to steal Ash's Pikachu. 

Other wild and trained Pikachu appear throughout the series, often interacting with Ash and his Pikachu. The most notable among these is Ritchie's Pikachu, . Like most other Pokémon, Pikachu communicates only by saying syllables of his own name. He is voiced by Ikue Ōtani in all versions of the anime. In Pokémon Live!, the musical stage show adapted from the anime, Pikachu was played by Jennifer Risser.

In the live-action film
In the 2019 film Detective Pikachu, a detective Pikachu is voiced by Ryan Reynolds and Ōtani. Pikachu is featured in a 2021 Katy Perry music video, "Electric".

In other media
Pikachu is a prominent Pokémon in many of the Pokémon manga series. In Pokémon Adventures, main characters Red and Yellow both train Pikachu, which create an egg that Gold hatches into a Pichu. Other series, including Pokémon Pocket Monsters, Magical Pokémon Journey and Getto Da Ze also feature Pikachu. Other manga series, such as Electric Tale of Pikachu, and Ash & Pikachu, feature Ash Ketchum's Pikachu from the anime series.

Reception

Promotion

As the mascot of the franchise, Pikachu has made multiple appearances in various promotional events and merchandise. In 1998, then Topeka, Kansas Mayor Joan Wagnon renamed the town "ToPikachu" for a day, and the renaming was repeated in 2018 by Mayor Michelle De La Isla with the release of the Pokémon Let's Go games. A "got milk?" advertisement featured Pikachu on April 25, 2000.

A Pikachu balloon has been featured in the Macy's Thanksgiving Day Parade since 2001. The original balloon was flown for the last time publicly at the Pokémon: Tenth Anniversary "Party of the Decade" on August 8, 2006, in Bryant Park in New York City, and a new Pikachu balloon that chases a Poké Ball and has light-up cheeks debuted at the 2006 parade. In the 2014 parade, a new Pikachu balloon was wearing a green scarf and holding a smaller Pikachu snowman. As of 2021, the latest balloon is that of a Pikachu and Eevee together in a sled.

Pikachu and ten other Pokémon were chosen as Japan's mascots in the 2014 FIFA World Cup. In August 2017, The Pokémon Company had partnered with Snap Inc. to bring Pikachu to the social media app, Snapchat. In December 2020, a 15-minute long ASMR video of Pikachu by The Pokémon Company was released. ANA Boeing 747-400 (JA8962) planes have been covered with images of Pokémon including Pikachu since 1998. In 2021, the first Pokémon Jet (Boeing 747-400D) featuring entirely Pikachu debuted. Pikachu has been made into several different toy and plush forms, as well as other items, including a robot Tomy Pikachu, figures, fishing lures, gaming setups, necklaces, hats, inflatable furniture, and wire loop games. In 2022, My Nintendo Japan released a Pikachu and Eevee cable holder.

Collectible cards featuring Pikachu have appeared since the initial Pokémon Trading Card Game released in October 1996, including limited edition promotional cards. One of these collectible cards was "Pikachu Illustrator", limited to about 20-40 printed in 1998, and was auctioned off for about $55,000 in 2016, and then $375,000 in 2021. For the franchise's 25th anniversary, The Pokémon Company announced special trading cards in 2021, each featuring 25 Pikachu drawn by 25 artists. The character has also been used in promotional merchandising at fast-food chains such as McDonald's, Wendy's and Burger King.

Pikachu has been mentioned in a variety of media, including TV series Top Gear and Heroes. Pikachu has appeared several times on The Simpsons from 2002 to 2010.

Protests
The Chilean independent politician Giovanna Grandón famously went to many protests during the 2019–2021 Chilean protests dressed in an inflatable Pikachu suit. In July 2021 during the Group of Seven climate summit, a group of protestors dressed as Pikachus demonstrated on Gyllyngvase Beach, Falmouth, while in November 2021, a group of activists dressed up as Pikachu to protest Japan's refusal to reduce coal consumption at COP26.

Biology
The name was inspired due to Pikachu's "lightning-fast moves and shocking electric effects".

Critical response
Pikachu has been well received by reviewers; it was ranked as the "second best person of the year" by Time in 1999, who called it "the most beloved animated character since Hello Kitty". The magazine noted Pikachu as the "public face of a phenomenon that has spread from Nintendo's fastest selling video game to a trading-card empire", citing the franchise's profits for the year as "the reason for the ranking", behind singer Ricky Martin but ahead of author J.K. Rowling.

Pikachu has ranked 20th to 4th place in anime, cartoon character, and video game character polls since 2000.  In 2003, Forbes ranked Pikachu as the "eighth top-earning fictional character of the year" with an income of $825 million. In 2004, the character dropped two spots to tenth on the list, taking in $825 million for a second straight year.  The character has been regarded as the Japanese answer to Mickey Mouse and as being part of a movement of "cute capitalism". Manga artist Hiro Mashima referred to Pikachu as "the greatest mascot character of all time!" when talking about adding these types of characters to series. Authors Tracey West and Katherine Noll called Pikachu the best Electric-type Pokémon and the best Pokémon overall. They added that if a person were to go around and ask Pokémon players who their favourite Pokémon was, they would "almost always" choose Pikachu. They also called Pikachu "brave and loyal". 

Zack Zwiezen of Kotaku praised the simplicity of Pikachu's design, describing it as "possibly one of the most iconic characters on the planet". Dale Bishir of IGN described Pikachu as the most important Pokémon that impacted the franchise's history, and further stated that "Its irresistible cuteness, merchandising power, army of clones in every generation... if your mom calls every Pokémon 'Pikachu', then you know in your heart that it is the most important Pokémon of all time." In 2019, Mitsuhiro Arita said that Pikachu and Charizard were "fan favourites" in Pokémon's design on the trading cards. Lauren Rouse of Kotaku listed Pikachu as the best animal companions that are the real MVPs of video games, stating that "Pikachu symbolises one of the best animal-human friendships in pop culture history and it makes a damn good Pokémon to have in your roster." Time Magazine named Pikachu as one of the twelve most influential video game characters of all time, lauding its appearance as the "most recognizable and beloved sidekick in pop culture." Hobby Consolas also included Pikachu on their "30 best heroes of the last 30 years." In 2021, Chris Morgan for Yardbarker described Pikachu as one of "the most memorable characters from old school Nintendo games", while Rachel Weber of GamesRadar ranked him as second iconic video game character of all time, stating that "If Pokemon has a spokesperson, it's the adorable and electrifying yellow fuzzball."

Conversely, Pikachu was ranked first in AskMens top 10 of the most irritating 1990s cartoon characters. Similarly, in a poll conducted by IGN, it was voted as the 48th best Pokémon, with the staff commenting "despite being the most recognized Pokémon in the world... Pikachu ranks surprisingly low on our top 100". Kotaku writer Patricia Hernandez criticized Pikachu's over-representation in Pokémon-related media, saying: "it's hard not to be barraged by Pikachu's constant presence if you're a Pokémon fan, and it sucks."

See also

 Pikachu (sculpture), New Orleans

Notes

References

Citations

Bibliography
 Loe, Casey, ed. Pokémon Special Pikachu Edition Official Perfect Guide. Sunnydale, California: Empire 21 Publishing, 1999.
 Barbo, Maria. The Official Pokémon Handbook. Scholastic Publishing, 1999. .
 Mylonas, Eric. Pokémon Pokédex Collector's Edition: Prima's Official Pokémon Guide. Prima Games, September 21, 2004. 
 Nintendo Power. Official Nintendo Pokémon FireRed Version & Pokémon LeafGreen Version Player's Guide. Nintendo of America Inc., August 2004. 
 Nintendo Power. Official Nintendo Pokémon Emerald Player's Guide. Nintendo of America Inc., April 2005.

Further reading

External links

 Pikachu on Pokemon.com
 
 Pikachu on Serebii

Characters in animated television series
Television characters introduced in 1997
Animated characters introduced in 1997
Fictional characters with electric or magnetic abilities
Nintendo protagonists
Pokémon characters
Fictional mice and rats
Pokémon species
Super Smash Bros. fighters
Video game characters introduced in 1996
Video game characters with electric or magnetic abilities
Video game mascots
Fictional rodents